The 2007 Moorilla Hobart International was a tennis tournament played on outdoor hard courts. It was the 14th edition of the Moorilla Hobart International, and was part of the Tier IV Series of the 2007 WTA Tour. It took place at the Hobart International Tennis Centre in Hobart, Australia, from 7 January through 12 January 2007. First-seeded  Anna Chakvetadze won the singles title.

Finals

Singles

 Anna Chakvetadze defeated  Vasilisa Bardina, 6–3, 7–6(7–3)

Doubles

 Elena Likhovtseva /  Elena Vesnina defeated  Anabel Medina Garrigues /  Virginia Ruano Pascual, 2–6, 6–1, 6–2

External links
 Official website
 ITF tournament edition details

 
Hobart International
Hobart International
Hobart International